Oattes Van Schaik (formerly known as The Limit) was a 1980s musical group composed of Dutch producers Bernard Oattes and Rob van Schaik. In 1982 they released the songs "Crimes of Passion" and  "She's So Divine" which was edited by Ben Liebrand. In 1985 they released a full-length album, which yielded the hit "Say Yeah" (featuring vocals by Gwen Guthrie). The song peaked at No. 17 on the UK Singles Chart and at No. 7 on the U.S. Billboard Dance/Club Play chart.
The duo also wrote and produced for other artists as The Limit Productions such as Centerfold and Five Star with the hit single "Love Take Over".

After 1986, Bernard Oattes pursued a solo career, and went on to produce three studio albums. According to his website, Bernard Oattes is Holland's favourite English voiceover artist. Rob van Schaik continues to write material for other artists and has also remixed several tracks.

Discography

Albums

Singles

References

External links
 The Limit Discography at Discogs.
 Bernard Oattes' Website.

Dutch musical duos
Dutch funk musical groups
Freestyle music groups
Arista Records artists
Dutch synthpop groups